The Godsend is a horror novel by British writer Bernard Taylor. It is his debut novel and was first published in 1976 by Souvenir Press.

Plot summary 
The story concerns the Marlowe family and an abandoned child named Bonnie, who they take into their home after she is left with them by a mysterious woman they meet on a day out at a nearby lake. The story is told in first person by Alan Marlowe, the father of the family, who gradually starts to suspect that the subsequent tragic deaths of his children were caused by Bonnie.

Adaptations 
The story was adapted into a film released in 1980 directed by Gabrielle Beaumont and starring Malcolm Stoddard, Cyd Hayman and Angela Pleasence. The film made its DVD debut courtesy of Shout! Factory and MGM Home Entertainment on August 20, 2013 and in summer 2015 for the first time on Blu-Ray via Scream Factory.

References

External links

British horror novels
1976 British novels
British novels adapted into films
1976 debut novels
Souvenir Press books